Blonay railway station is a railway station in the municipality of Blonay, in the Swiss canton of Vaud. It is located at the junction of the  Vevey–Les Pléiades and Blonay–Chamby railway lines. Both are owned by Transports Montreux–Vevey–Riviera, although the latter is operated as a heritage railway by the Blonay–Chamby Museum Railway.

Services 
 the following services stop at Blonay:

 Blonay–Chamby Museum Railway: On Saturdays and Sundays between May and October, hourly service in daylight to  via .

References

External links 
 
 

Railway stations in the canton of Vaud
Transports Montreux–Vevey–Riviera stations